Rilić may refer to:

 Rilić, Kupres, a village near Kupres, Bosnia
 Rilić (mountain), a mountain south of Biokovo, Croatia